Mr. Lahtinen Takes French Leave is a 1939 Finnish film directed by Nyrki Tapiovaara. It is based on a play by Kjeld Abell. The film was released on 10 September 1939.

Cast
 Fritz-Hugo Backman as Mr. Lahtinen
 Märtha Jaatinen as Edit Lahtinen
 Hertta Leistén as Mother-in-law
 Lauri Korpela as Kaarlo
 Liisa Nevalainen as Second Ms. Salminen
 Rosi Rinne as First Ms. Salminen
 Antti Halonen as Lord Roqueford
 Henake Schubak as Street singer
 Jalmari Parikka as Newsvendor Lahtinen

References

External links
 

1939 drama films
1939 films
Finnish films based on plays
Films directed by Nyrki Tapiovaara
Finnish drama films